Qarenjeh may refer to:
 Qarenjeh-ye Bozorg
 Qarenjeh-ye Kuchek